Huber Heights is a suburb of Dayton in Montgomery and Miami counties in the U.S. state of Ohio. Its origins trace back to the now-defunct Wayne Township, which was settled in the early-mid 1800s. Wayne Township was incorporated as the City of Huber Heights on January 23, 1981. The city is named for Charles Huber, the developer who constructed a number of the houses that would later constitute the city. Suburban development began in the area in 1956. Huber Heights continued to grow by annexing parcels in Miami County. Huber Heights is the third largest suburb in the Dayton Metropolitan Statistical Area by population, behind Kettering with 57,862, and Beavercreek with 46,549. Huber Heights' current mayor is Jeff Gore. The population of Huber Heights was 43,439 at the 2020 census. This was a 14% increase since the 2010 census, making it the largest growth in Montgomery County in the last decade.

History

Wayne Township 
In the early-mid 1800s, the Wayne township was settled.

Geography
Most of Huber Heights is in Montgomery County, while the city has more recently annexed land in Miami County. One small parcel of the city was located in Greene County, but it was detached from the city in 2013.

Demographics

2010 census
As of the census of 2010, there were 38,101 people, 14,720 households, and 10,552 families residing in the city. The racial makeup of the city was 79.6% White, 13.0% African American, 0.3% Native American, 2.5% Asian, 0.1% Pacific Islander, 1.0% from other races, and 3.5% from two or more races. Hispanic or Latino of any race were 3.1% of the population.

There were 14,720 households, of which 35.8% had children under the age of 18 living with them, 51.5% were married couples living together, 14.9% had a female householder with no husband present, 5.3% had a male householder with no wife present, and 28.3% were non-families. 22.8% of all households were made up of individuals, and 8.1% had someone living alone who was 65 years of age or older. The average household size was 2.58 and the average family size was 3.01.

The median age in the city was 37.4 years. 25.4% of residents were under the age of 18; 8.2% were between the ages of 18 and 24; 26.3% were from 25 to 44; 27.2% were from 45 to 64; and 12.9% were 65 years of age or older. The gender makeup of the city was 48.3% male and 51.7% female.

2000 census
As of the census of 2000, there were 38,212 people, 14,392 households, and 10,779 families residing in the city. The population density was 1,817.2 people per square mile (701.6/km2). There were 14,938 housing units at an average density of 710.4 per square mile (274.3/km2). The racial makeup of the city was 84.88% White, 9.78% African American, 0.28% Native American, 2.18% Asian, 0.06% Pacific Islander, 0.58% from other races, and 2.25% from two or more races. Hispanic or Latino of any race were 1.66% of the population.

There were 14,392 households, of which 36.9% had children under the age of 18 living with them, 58.7% were married couples living together, 12.0% had a female householder with no husband present, and 25.1% were non-families. 20.5% of all households were made up of individuals, and 5.9% had someone living alone who was 65 years of age or older. The average household size was 2.64 and the average family size was 3.05.

In the city the population was spread out, with 27.4% under the age of 18, 8.6% from 18 to 24, 31.1% from 25 to 44, 23.7% from 45 to 64, and 9.3% who were 65 years of age or older. The median age was 34 years. For every 100 females, there were 95.0 males. For every 100 females age 18 and over, there were 91.8 males.

The median income for a household in the city was $49,073, and the median income for a family was $53,579. Males had a median income of $40,099 versus $28,723 for females. The per capita income for the city was $20,951. About 4.2% of families and 5.9% of the population were below the poverty line, including 6.6% of those under age 18 and 5.6% of those age 65 or over.

Economy
Huber Heights' location near the intersection of I-70 and I-75 has long made it an attractive hub for the trucking industry.  With two exits on I-70, many popular chain restaurants exist near the exits such as Panera Bread, McDonald's, Burger King, Sonic, Waffle House (one at each exit), Texas Roadhouse, Arby's, Tim Horton's, Applebee's, Fazoli's, Skyline Chili, Rooster's, and Buffalo Wild Wings, Starbucks, Cane's among others.  There are also various strip malls in Huber Heights.  Marian Shopping Center, located near the intersection of Brandt Pike and Fishburg Road, is slated for redevelopment, which the city purchased for $2.8 million.

The city chamber of commerce notes the following large businesses as operating within the city: ABF Freight System, Inc. Apache Technologies, Dayton Freight, NDC Technologies, AIDA/DTC, Bowser Morner, Coca-Cola, Enginetics, Fukuvi USA, Hughes-Peters, Metokote and Trimble Navigation.

In January 2013, Magnetar Capital bought 1,900 properties in Huber Heights from the family of the original developer. It rents these homes as part of its overall investment strategy. About one in every eleven homes in the city is owned by the firm.

Top employers
According to the city's 2017 Comprehensive Annual Financial Report, the top employers in the city are:

Education
 Huber Heights has a public library, a branch of the Dayton Metro Library.

Tourist attractions
 Rose Music Center at The Heights - entertainment/ music venue
 Carriage Hill Metropark - nature/ parks & recreation
 Ving Tsun Museum - museum
 Thomas Cloud Memorial Park - parks & recreation
 Good Samaritan Field at Heidikamp Stadium (Wayne High School) - sports

Notable people
 Will Allen – former safety for the Pittsburgh Steelers
 George Crook – Civil War general, born on family farm at corner of Chambersburg and Endicott roads
 Kelley Deal – musician, The Breeders
 Kim Deal – musician, The Breeders
 Dallas Egbert – sixteen-year-old child prodigy whose four-week disappearance in 1979 was incorrectly attributed to steam tunnels and Dungeons & Dragons
 Marcus Freeman – former linebacker for the Ohio State Buckeyes and in the National Football League, currently head coach for the University of Notre Dame
 Victor Heflin – former NFL defensive back, St. Louis Cardinals
 Vince Heflin – former NFL wide receiver, Miami Dolphins and Tampa Bay Buccaneers
 Tyree Kinnel - former University of Michigan safety, former NFL practice squad player
 Trey Landers - professional basketball player, played college basketball for the Dayton Flyers
 Mike Mickens – former NFL cornerback, currently cornerbacks coach for the University of Notre Dame
 Braxton Miller – former starting quarterback and wide receiver for the Ohio State Buckeyes, former NFL wide receiver
 Greg Orton – former Purdue University wide receiver, former NFL wide receiver
 Teresa Pace, PhD – Institute of Electrical and Electronics Engineers (IEEE) Fellow, past president of IEEE Aerospace and Electronic Systems Society
 Kofi Sarkodie – Defender for San Jose Earthquakes in Major League Soccer
 Kyle Swords – former professional soccer player
 D'Mitrik Trice - Former Point guard for University of Wisconsin men's basketball, played 2021 NBA Summer League for the Milwaukee Bucks
 Travis Trice – former Michigan State basketball player
 Larry Turner – former NFL offensive lineman, St. Louis Rams and Cincinnati Bengals
 Xeyrius Williams - Professional basketball player
 Jerel Worthy – defensive tackle for the Buffalo Bills

Sister cities

See also
 Arnold Homestead
 Ausenbaugh-McElhenny House
 Huber Heights City School District
 Wayne High School (Ohio)

References

External links
City website
Huber Heights Chamber of Commerce

Cities in Ohio
Cities in Miami County, Ohio
Cities in Montgomery County, Ohio
Populated places established in 1980